The Youngcopter Neo is a German NOTAR helicopter that was designed by Björn Jung and is under development by his company, Youngcopter of Mainz. It was first publicly introduced at the ILA Berlin Air Show in 2008. The aircraft is intended to be supplied as a kit for amateur construction.

No projected date has been announced for kit deliveries and no pricing has been set as of January 2018.

Design and development
The Neo was designed to comply with the amateur-built aircraft construction rules. The first prototype was completed in 2008 and ground run. By 2010 ground testing had been completed, including rotor system tracking and balancing. The prototype first flew in hovering flight on 31 October 2011 and developmental hover flight testing continued through 2015.

The Neo design features a single main rotor, with no tail rotor, a two-seats-in side-by-side configuration enclosed cockpit with a windshield, skid landing gear and a twin-rotor  Neosis Wankel engine.

The aircraft fuselage is composite material monocoque design.

The Neo kit under development is intended to be constructed by a person with average mechanical skills. It will not require any welding or composite materials lamination work. The proposed kit will include all sub-assemblies, engine and instruments.

Specifications (Neo)

See also
List of rotorcraft

References

External links

First flight video

Neo
2010s German sport aircraft
2010s German civil utility aircraft
2010s German helicopters
Homebuilt aircraft
Aircraft first flown in 2011
NOTAR helicopters
Rotary-engined aircraft
Wankel-engined helicopters